Tvrdošín ( or Thurdossin;) is a town in central Slovakia.

Geography
The town is located at the confluence of the Orava and Oravica rivers,  from the Polish borders and cca.  from Dolný Kubín. It consists of the boroughs of Krásna Hôrka, Medvedzie, and Tvrdošín.

History
The town was mentioned in the Zobor documents in 1111 and in the document of Béla III of Hungary in 1183. It received royal free town privileges in 1369.

Demographics
According to the 2001 census, the town had 9,544 inhabitants. 99.03% of inhabitants were Slovaks, 0.53% Czechs and 0.19% Polish. The religious make-up was 92.10% Roman Catholics, 4.84% people with no religious affiliation and 1.18% Lutherans.

Twin towns — Sister cities

Tvrdošín is twinned with:

 Kościelisko, Poland
 Kobylnica, Poland 
 Durbuy, Belgium
 Orimattila, Finland
 Östhammar, Sweden
 Uusikaupunki, Finland
 Valga, Estonia
 Valka, Latvia
 Weißenburg in Bayern, Germany

References

External links
 Official website
 

Cities and towns in Slovakia